Tenderness is the second solo album by Duff McKagan, released on May 31, 2019. Loudwire named it one of the 50 best rock albums of 2019.

Background and recording
The album was inspired by McKagan's global travels on Guns N' Roses' Not in This Lifetime... Tour and is considered a musical follow up to his 2015 How to be a Man book. The recording of the album began in-between McKagan's tour with Guns N' Roses and featured collaborations with Shooter Jennings, The Waters and The Suicide Horn Section, amongst others.

The song "Last September" was written as a warning in support of Me Too movement with its lyrics detailing an unwanted sexual encounter.

The song "Wasted Heart" is a re-recording of the song from the 2009 Duff McKagan's Loaded album Sick.

Promotion
Duff McKagan made a video announcement of two solo live shows featuring Shooter Jennings to occur in May previewing a new song during the video on February 19, 2019. The song was later revealed as the first single, "Tenderness", released on 22 February 2019, accompanied by the lyric video. The second song released from the album along with the announcement of the album details was "Chip Away". On April 19 McKagan premiered the third new song "Don't Look Behind You" and on May 17 another new song titled "Last September".

A tour in support of the album featuring Shooter Jennings is set to start on May 30, 2019.

Release
The album was released in several versions, including on CD, LP and deluxe yellow and red starburst coloured LP editions. The LP edition of the album omits the track "Cold Outside" and switches the order of "Feel" and "Breaking Rocks".

Track listing
All songs written by Duff McKagan except unless noted.

Personnel

Duff McKagan - vocals, bass guitar, acoustic guitar
John Schreffler - guitar (tracks 1, 4, 6-7), backing vocals (tracks 1, 2, 5, 8), pedal steel guitar (tracks 2, 3, 5, 7); 12-String Acoustic Guitar (track 9)
Jonathan Wilson - lead guitar, synth (tracks 1, 4, 8)
Jon Graboff - pedal steel guitar (track 1, 7)
Jamie Douglass - drums, percussion (all tracks except 1), backing vocals (track 5)
Aubrey Richmond - fiddle (track 1-3, 5-7), backing vocals (tracks 1-2, 5, 8)
Mike Squires - backing vocals (track 2)
Shooter Jennings - keyboards (all tracks except 1), guitar (track 2), backing vocals (track 2), vocals (track 7), producing, mixing
Steve Elliot - guitar (tracks 3, 10)
James King - saxophone (track 3)
The Waters - backing vocals (tracks 4, 8, 10)
Jesse Dayton - lead guitar (track 7)
Brian Scanlon - saxophone (track 10)
Matt McKagan - trombone (track 10)
Chuck Findley - trumpet (track 10)

Additional personnel
Pete Lyman - mastering at Infrasonic Sound, Los Angeles, CA, United States
Mark Rains - engineer
Mike "McBob" Mayhue - technician
Jason Feinberg, Alex Sale - product manager
Brian Klein - management
Beth Sabbagh, DWA - business management
Donny Phillips, KIHL Studio - art direction, design
Scott Dudelson, Jesse DeFlorio - photography
Andrew Daw, Jeff Fura - A&R
Doug Mark - legal
Duff Battye, Michael Moses, Sujata Murthy - public relations

Charts

References

2019 albums
Duff McKagan albums